Ceratocanthinae is a subfamily of the scarabaeoid beetle family Hybosoridae. It includes three tribes comprising 43 genera and 366 species; it was formerly treated as a separate family, Ceratocanthidae.

Description
Ceratocanthinae are small sized beetles from 2.0 to 10.0 millimeters in length. Adult beetles can be found on the bark and branches of dead trees and on fungus.

Distribution
Ceratocanthinae are relatively widespread. They can be found in Australian, Afrotropical, Indomalaysian, Neotropical, Nearctic, and Palaearctic regions.

Ecology
The adults have been found to associate with termites and ants. Larvae live under bark and in burrows of bessbugs (Passalidae).

Taxonomy 
The subfamily Ceratocanthinae contains 43 genera:

References

External links
 Generic Guide to New World Scarab Beetles HYBOSORIDAE... Ceratocanthinae Martínez, 1968

Scarabaeiformia
Beetle subfamilies